Krāslava Municipality is a municipality in Latgale, Latvia. The municipality was formed in 2001 by merging Krāslava Parish and Krāslava town. In 2009 it absorbed Auleja Parish, Indra Parish, Izvalta Parish, Kalnieši Parish, Kaplava Parish, Kombuļi Parish, Piedruja Parish, Robežnieki Parish, Skaista Parish and Ūdrīši Parish town the administrative centre being Krāslava.

On 1 July 2021, Krāslava Municipality was enlarged when the territory of the former Dagda Municipality and three parishes of the former Aglona Municipality were merged into it.

Demographics

Ethnic composition 

As of 1 January 2010 the ethnic composition of the municipality is as follows:

Images

See also 
 Administrative divisions of Latvia (2009)
 Lake Drīdzis

References 

 
Municipalities of Latvia
Latgale